Merode is a railway and metro station in Brussels, Belgium. It lies in the municipality of Etterbeek, near the border between Etterbeek, the City of Brussels and Schaerbeek. The metro end is under the /, which is the start of the Avenue de Tervueren/Tervurenlaan, a major thoroughfare, while the mainline railway station end is under the /. The two stations are connected by a long underground concourse punctuated by ticket barriers. The area is named in honour of Jean Philippe Eugène de Mérode.

Metro station
Merode station opened in 1976 and was served by the first heavy metro service ever in Brussels (earlier underground services elsewhere were operated by trams). The station is located at the eastern end of the common branch of lines 1 and 5. One metro train out of two coming from Schuman continues to the south-east of the city through Thieffry towards Herrmann-Debroux in the municipality of Auderghem; this branch is currently line 5. Line 1 continues to the east through Montgomery towards Stokkel/Stockel in the municipality of Woluwe-Saint-Pierre.

The station is unusual in having its eastbound and westbound tracks one on top of the other, which avoids an at-grade fork. As a result, each platform faces a blank wall across the track, which has been decorated with tiling to improve the station's atmosphere. Originally, it was planned to be underneath the building of the Bank Bruxelles Lambert. Due to security issues, this idea was not fully implemented. However, leftovers of this idea are still visible in the building.

Railway station

The underground railway station has two tracks with two side platforms and is served by the suburban services of the National Railway Company of Belgium (NMBS/SNCB)'s line 26, as part of the Brussels Regional Express Network (RER/GEN) services.

Train services
The station is served by the following service(s):
 Brussels RER services (S4) Mechelen - Vilvoorde - Merode - Etterbeek - Brussels-Luxembourg - Denderleeuw - Aalst (weekdays)
 Brussels RER services (S7) Vilvoorde - Arcaden - Halle (weekdays)

Area
Several places of interest are located around this station among which the famous Cauchie House (house of the architect ), the Parc du Cinquantenaire/Jubelpark, the Avenue de Tervueren/Tervurenlaan (one of the oldest avenues in Brussels) and the Royal Military Academy. The station offers a connection with the Brussels tram route 81 as well as the bus routes 22, 27 and 80.

References

External links

Etterbeek
Railway stations in Brussels
Brussels metro stations
Railway stations opened in 1976